The 1976 WHA Amateur Draft was the fourth draft held by the World Hockey Association.


Selections by Round
Below are listed the selections in the 1976 WHA Amateur Draft.

Round 1

The Toronto Toros, New England Whalers and Houston Aeros lost their first round picks for having signed underage juniors in 1975: Toronto for Mark Napier, New England for Gordie Roberts and Houston for John Tonelli.

Round 2

Round 3

Round 4

Round 5

Round 6

Round 7

Round 8

Round 9

Round 10

See also
1976 NHL Amateur Draft
1976–77 WHA season

References
1976 WHA Amateur Draft on Hockeydb.com

WHA Amateur Drafts
Draft